Ambience Public Schools is a group of K12 and primary schools located in New Delhi and Gurgaon (Haryana), India. The medium of instruction is in English with the Central Board of Secondary Education as core curriculum.

History
Ambience Public School is a co-educational Senior Secondary schools affiliated to the Central Board of Secondary Education. School was established in year 1971 at New Delhi and 2018 at Gurgaon.

The two schools

Ambience Public School, New Delhi
The school was previously known as Hill Grove Public School in New Delhi. The old building was demolished and a new building was built. The first academic session which took place in the building was in 2013–2014. It is located in the prime area of Safdarjung Enclave.

Ambience Public School, Gurgaon
Ambience Public School was established in year 2018 and located on a 5-acre plot opposite the golf course near DLF Phase 5 in Sector 43, Gurgaon.

References

Private schools in Delhi 
Schools in Delhi
Schools in Gurgaon
Educational institutions established in 1971